Mangen is a lake in the municipalities of Eidskog in Innlandet county and Aurskog-Høland in Viken county, Norway.

See also
List of lakes in Norway

References

Lakes of Innlandet
Lakes of Viken (county)
Aurskog-Høland
Eidskog